Strike Team may refer to:

Firefighting
Strike Team, in the New South Wales Rural Fire Service, it is several fire trucks of the same class
Strike Team, a special unit of firefighters in South Australia's Country Fire Service
Strike Team, a special unit of firefighters in Victoria's Country Fire Authority; in Victoria, a Strike Team usually refers to a unit of five appliances used to fight large, campaign-sized wildfires such as those in the Black Saturday bushfires

Special forces
Strike team, a colloquialism for SWAT Team
Strike Team, a unit composed of similar resource types in the FEMA Incident Command Structure
Strike Team, a team of the U.S. Coast Guard's National Strike Force

Other uses
Strike Team, the fictional tactical unit on The Shield